The Methodist Boys' High School, was founded as the Wesleyan Boys' High School, is a secondary school founded in Freetown, Sierra Leone, by the May family under the auspices of the Wesleyan Society on 6 April 1874. The school is affiliated to the Methodist Girls' High School (Sierra Leone) established by James Taylor, the uncle of Samuel Coleridge-Taylor under the auspices of the Wesleyan Society on 1 January 1880.

Sources
http://mbhsalumniassociationtx.org/school.html

Schools in Freetown
Secondary schools in Sierra Leone
Educational institutions established in 1874
Methodism in Sierra Leone
Boys' schools in Sierra Leone
1874 establishments in Sierra Leone